Olavi Hjellman (born 22 February 1945) is a Finnish speed skater. He competed in two events at the 1968 Winter Olympics.

References

External links
 

1945 births
Living people
Finnish male speed skaters
Olympic speed skaters of Finland
Speed skaters at the 1968 Winter Olympics
People from Kimitoön
Sportspeople from Southwest Finland